Carlos Alós-Ferrer (born November 22, 1970, in Moncofa, Spain) is a professor of decision and neuroeconomic theory at the University of Zurich and is currently the editor in chief of the Journal of Economic Psychology.

He holds a M.Sc. in mathematics from the University of Valencia (Spain, 1992) and a Ph.D. in economics from the University of Alicante (Spain, 1998). He has been assistant professor at the University of Vienna (Austria, 1997–2002), associate professor at the University of Salamanca (Spain, 2002–2004), and associate professor at the University of Vienna (2004–2005). He became a full professor of microeconomics at the University of Konstanz (Germany, 2005) and later moved to the University of Cologne (Germany, 2012). In 2018, he joined the University of Zurich as professor of decision and neuroeconomic theory (endowed by the NOMIS foundation).

Alós-Ferrer has worked extensively in game theory, bounded rationality, social choice, and  behavioral economics. From 2012 to 2018, he was speaker of the interdisciplinary research unit "Psychoeconomics," which used methods from psychology, economics, and neuroscience to study human decision making, and was funded by the German Research Foundation (DFG).  Since January 2019, he is the editor in chief of the Journal of Economic Psychology. His research interests are neuroeconomics, decision theory, game theory, evolution and learning in games and markets.

Selected publications 

 Alós-Ferrer, Carlos, Jaume García-Segarra, and Alexander Ritschel (2021). Generous with Individuals and Selfish to the Masses, Nature Human Behaviour, forthcoming.
Alós-Ferrer, Carlos, Ernst Fehr, and Nick Netzer (2021). Time Will Tell: Recovering Preferences when Choices are Noisy, Journal of Political Economy, 29 (6), pp. 1828-1877.
Alós-Ferrer, Carlos (2018). A Review Essay on Social Neuroscience: Can Research on the Social Brain and Economics Inform Each Other?, Journal of Economic Literature, 56 (1), pp. 234–264.
 Alós-Ferrer, Carlos and Klaus Ritzberger (2016). The Theory of Extensive Form Games. Springer-Verlag Berlin Heidelberg. .
 Achtziger, Anja and Carlos Alós-Ferrer (2014). Fast or Rational? A Response-Times Study of Bayesian Updating, Management Science, 60 (4), pp. 923–938.
 Achtziger, Anja, Carlos Alós-Ferrer, Sabine Hügelschäfer, and Marco Steinhauser (2014). The Neural Basis of Belief Updating and Rational Decision Making, Social Cognitive and Affective Neuroscience, 9 (1), pp. 55–62.
 Alós-Ferrer, Carlos and Nick Netzer (2010). The Logit-Response Dynamics, Games and Economic Behavior, 68 (2), pp. 413–427.

References

External links 
 University of Zurich, personal webpage.

Living people
1970 births
Academic staff of the University of Zurich
University of Valencia alumni
People from Plana Baixa